The Swan 53 Mk2 was designed by German Frers and built by Nautor's Swan and first launched in 2004.

External links
 Nautor Swan
 German Frers Official Website

References

Sailing yachts
Keelboats
2000s sailboat type designs
Sailboat types built by Nautor Swan
Sailboat type designs by Germán Frers